Alexandre Fischer (born 19 January 1998) is a French rugby union player. His position is back row and he currently plays for Clermont in the Top 14.

References

External links

1998 births
Living people
People from Chaumont, Haute-Marne
French rugby union players
ASM Clermont Auvergne players
Rugby union flankers
Sportspeople from Haute-Marne